The Odd Fellows Mansion (Danish: Odd Fellow Palæet) is a Rococo town mansion in Copenhagen, Denmark, named after the local branch of the Independent Order of Odd Fellows which acquired the building in 1900. Before that, it was known as the Berckentin and later the Schimmelmann Mansion after its successive owners.

The Building is located on Bredgade, opposite Dronningens Tværgade for which it serves as a point de vue. It houses a concert hall which is open to the public.

History

The Berckentin era
The site was formerly located in the cast Sophie Amalienborg gardens. The presen6t building on the site was constructed in conjunction with the developemtn of the new Frederiksstaden district. It was designed by Johann Gottfried Rosenberg under the supervision of Nicolai Eigtved who had also conceived the district plan. It was built as a home for the wealthy merchant and politician Christian August von Berckentin who had just been ennobled with the title of count.

The property was listed in the new cadastre of 1756 as No. 71 SS in St. Ann's East Quarter. It was marked on [[Gedde's maps of Copenhagen|Christian Gedde's 1757 cadastral map of St. Ann's East Quarter as No. 302.

After Berckentin's death in 1758, the Berckentin Mansion was taken over by his son-in-law, Christian Sigfred von Plessen, who also owned Glorup Manor on Funen, and had married von Berckentin's daughter Louise von Plessen née Berckentin in 1744.

Schimmelmann family

In 1762, Heinrich von Schimmelmann bought the property which now became known as the Schimmelmann Mansion. After his son Ernst Schimmelmann inherited it in 1782, the Schimmelmann Mansion became the centre of a colourful cultural life. Ernst and his wife, Charlotte Schimmelmann, shared a deep interest in the arts and Charlotte was famous for her salons. In the summer, these pursuits were relocated to their summer residence at Sølyst north of the city.

Schimmelmann's property was listed in the new cadastre of 1806 as No. 171 in St. Ann's Quarter.

The property was after Ernst Schimmelmann's death in 1831 passed to his son Carl von Schimmelmann, It was after his death just two uears later passed to his son Ernst Conrad Carl Joseph von Schimmelmann.

Later history
In the nineteenth century, the mansion was occupied by various wealthy families, notably by Rudolph Puggaard who received there the artists of the Danish Golden Age.

Cultural references
The building is used as a location in the 1997 film Smilla's Sense of Snow. It is also used as a location in an episode of the YV series Matador.

See also
 Freemason's Hall, Copenhagen
 Thott Mansion

References

External links
 Source

Houses in Copenhagen
Listed residential buildings in Copenhagen
Rococo architecture in Copenhagen
Music venues in Copenhagen
Houses completed in 1755
Odd Fellows buildings
Independent Order of Odd Fellows
Buildings and structures associated with the Puggaard family